The Valea Caselor is a left tributary of the river Arieș in Romania. It flows into the Arieș in Lupșa.

References

Rivers of Romania
Rivers of Alba County